Colegio España is a Chilean high school located in San Vicente de Tagua Tagua, Cachapoal Province, Chile. It was established in 1973.

References 

Educational institutions established in 1973
Secondary schools in Chile
Schools in Cachapoal Province
1973 establishments in Chile